Yuriy Romanovych Zakharkiv (born 21 March 1996) is a Ukrainian football striker who plays for Ahrobiznes Volochysk.

Career
Zakharkiv is the product of the Ternopil and Karpaty Lviv School Systems. He made his debut for FC Karpaty in a game against Illichivets Mariupol on 2 May 2015 in Ukrainian Premier League.

In August 2018 he became a member of Lithuanian Atlantas Klaipėda and play in A lyga.

References

External links

1996 births
Living people
Sportspeople from Ternopil
Ukrainian footballers
Association football forwards
FC Karpaty Lviv players
FC Ternopil players
SC Dnipro-1 players
FC Olimpik Donetsk players
FK Atlantas players
MFK Zemplín Michalovce players
FK Slavoj Trebišov players
FK Jelgava players
FK Khujand players
FC Lviv players
FC Zhetysu players
FC Ahrobiznes Volochysk players
Ukrainian Premier League players
Ukrainian First League players
Ukrainian Second League players
Tajikistan Higher League players
Latvian Higher League players
Slovak Super Liga players
2. Liga (Slovakia) players
A Lyga players
Ukrainian expatriate footballers
Ukrainian expatriate sportspeople in Lithuania
Ukrainian expatriate sportspeople in Slovakia
Ukrainian expatriate sportspeople in Tajikistan
Ukrainian expatriate sportspeople in Latvia
Ukrainian expatriate sportspeople in Kazakhstan
Expatriate footballers in Lithuania
Expatriate footballers in Slovakia
Expatriate footballers in Tajikistan
Expatriate footballers in Latvia
Expatriate footballers in Kazakhstan